Nerita patula is a species of sea snail, a marine gastropod mollusk in the family Neritidae.

Description

Distribution

References

 Vallejo B. jr. 2000. Una nuova specie di Nerita (linnaeus, 1758) dal mare di Sibuyan, Filippine centrali, e note sulla sua ecologia e posizione sistematica. La Conchiglia, 296: 23-27

External links
 Gould, A.A. (1847). Descriptions of the following Shells, from the collection of the Exploring Expedition. Proceedings of the Boston Society of Natural History, 2: 237-239. Boston
 Subba Rao, N. V.; Dey, A. (2000). Catalogue of Marine Molluscs of Andaman and Nicobar Islands. Zoological Survey of India, Calcutta, Occasional Paper. 187: 199-294

Neritidae
Gastropods described in 1841